is a Japanese manga series written and illustrated by Tsuyoshi Watanabe.  The series is published by Fujimi Shobo in Japan and by Yen Press in the United States.

Plot
As a six-year-old, Rintaro is diagnosed Hentai Syndrome, a disease that could kill him if he becomes sexually aroused. To save him and provide a way for him to live as normal a life as possible, his father teaches him the ways to control his body and mind for ten years in the mountains. When he turns 16, he chooses to enroll into Nangokuren High School, which he believed to be the largest all-boys school in the country. In fact, it is the largest all-girls school that has just become coed.  Rintaro now sees transferring out as his mission, but unfortunately for him, he has caught the eye of the three "Dragons", the female leaders of the three biggest factions at the school.

Characters

The main male protagonist who is diagnosed with Hentai Syndrome, a rare disease that would be proved fatal if he sexually aroused by some unexpected incidents, which involves nudity. He often try to avoid any lewd thoughts through having a clear mind and a silent and serene heart. He attends to Nangokuren High School because he mistakenly thought it would be an all-boys school.

The female protagonist and Rintaro's disciple who viewed bond and friendship as her main strength and willing to help the innocent and helpless students from oppression. She is the leader of her faction of the academy, Ryōzenpaku,  one of three main factions in the school.

One of the strongest student of the academy, Kyōka is one of the Dragon whose fighting skills are superior towards both Ayane and Rino. In her philosophy, Kyōka believes the strong ensures eternal survival, which opposes Ayane's philosophy of bonds and benevolence. She is also one of few that knows about Rintaro's disease.

The smartest and the sharpest student in the academy, Rino is one of the Dragons who uses tactics and wits to defeat her rival. Unlike Ayane and Kyōka, who settle their rivalry with their fists, Rino is an opportunist who observe the situation first, then using the perfect timing to execute her plan for victory. Due to her philosophy that victors would win without failure, Rino often uses anyone as her pawn for her plan and deemed "useless" people would only block her path to become the strongest.

Release
Tsuyoshi Watanabe began serializing the manga in the December issue of Fujimi Shobo's shōnen manga magazine Monthly Dragon Age on November 9, 2012.

North American publisher Yen Press announced its license to the series at its panel at Sakura-Con on April 3, 2015.

Volumes

Reception
Nick Smith of ICv2 was unimpressed with the series, calling it "a disappointing step downward in quality for Yen Press."  He gave the first volume two stars out of five, calling it "a weirdly unfunny high school martial arts harem comedy".  He felt that the fanservice was excessive, despite its attempts to be self-referentially humorous, and opined that the series' only audience would be "readers who want to look at exaggerated, hyper-sexualized high school girls."

Richard Gutierrez of The Fandom Post was much more positive toward the manga, giving it an A+.  He wrote that "Tsuyoshi Watanabe has done a masterful job of comically combining Rintaro’s suffering, dynamically over the top battles and buxom beauties to create a wonderful story of endurance within a harem atmosphere."  Commenting on the fanservice, he wrote that "the average male reader will of course ogle the fan service dotted across the pages, but it is a shame if you overlook the strong female leads", and questioned Yen Press' decision to rate the series as "mature" due to that element, believing it to be less harmful than the gore in series which had received a lower rating.  He concluded by writing that "Dragons Rioting is a becoming a great story of suffering and friendship which I hope will extend into a complete franchise within the near future."

References

External links
  at Monthly Dragon Age 
 

Fujimi Shobo manga
Yen Press titles
Shōnen manga
School life in anime and manga